Myoporum boninense subsp. australe, the boobialla, is a seaside shrub found in eastern Australia. The original specimen was collected at Batemans Bay.

References

boninense australe
Flora of New South Wales
Flora of Queensland
Lamiales of Australia
Plant subspecies